Malavedan (Malai Vedan) is a Dravidian language of Kerala and Tamil Nadu that is closely related to Malayalam. Malavedan speakers are one of the tribal groups in Kerala. Many of them live in the Ernakulam, Kollam, Kottayam, Idukki, Pathanamthitta, and Thiruvananthapuram districts.

References

Malayalam language